BPP University is a private university in the United Kingdom.

History

Name
The university takes its name from the founders Alan Brierley, Richard Price and Charles Prior, who in 1975 set up Brierley Price Prior to train accountancy students.

University status
BPP was first granted degree-awarding powers in 2007, and degree-awarding powers for an indefinite time period in 2020. On 8 August 2013, BPP University College of Professional Studies was granted the title of university and rebranded as BPP University. That November, BPP was awarded the EducationInvestor magazine's "Higher/Professional Education Provider of the Year 2013" title. The August 2013 granting of university status to BPP was criticised by the University and College Union in an open letter. During the previous March, the union had written to then UK Business Secretary Vince Cable, urging him to suspend BPP's application for university title, pending an investigation into its relationship with its parent companies, saying, "At risk are both the interests of BPP students and the international credibility of the UK university title."

Development
In September 2017, Times Higher Education reported that BPP had shut down its degree programme in dental and oral sciences with immediate effect after it failed to meet General Dental Council standards just a year after launching the course in 2016, leaving new students unable to start and existing undergraduate students facing an uncertain future.

In June 2017, BPP was ranked "Bronze" in the Teaching Excellence Framework, a government-backed initiative to make teaching standards more transparent for students, with the categories for education institutions being "Gold", "Silver" and "Bronze".

BPP's undergraduate Bachelor of Laws (LL.B.) programme, which was first set up in 2009, was suspended in May 2018 pending a review of the law school's entire programme portfolio. Enrollment in the LL.B. had fallen from 665 undergraduates in 2014 to 105 students by 2017. In July 2018, as a result of the LL.B. suspension, Legal Cheek revealed that BPP had made several staff redundant at its Waterloo campus.

In November 2018, BPP's apprenticeship provision was given an 'Insufficient' rating by Ofsted. In February 2019, Department for Education banned BPP from recruiting new apprentices citing ‘insufficient progress’.

In April 2019, the Bar Standards Board (BSB) launched an investigation after a seating plan error resulted in a number of  Bar Professional Training Course (BPTC) students at BPP University sitting an exam in what some students likened to a “canteen”.

In May 2019, The Lawyer revealed that BPP University in London was the most expensive BPTC course provider in the country for students in 2019–20, with fees nearly £3,000 higher than the national average.

In July 2019, the university's law school had to issue an apology after several students on its  Legal Practice Course (LPC) received their advocacy assessment materials 48 hours later than promised, with their face-to-face assessments due the following weekend.

BPP University Law School was partnered and appointed as the provider of training for Solicitors Qualifying Examination (SQE) to the City Consortium in December 2019.

In 2020, BPP and Grant Thornton LLP launched a coaching professional apprenticeship and in March 2021, launched two data apprenticeship programmes (Digital Accountant/ Internal Training) for Grant Thornton and Mazars.

In May 2020, BPP was accused of "threatening to withhold" January exam results from students whose fees were overdue. Over 700 BPP students were said to have been affected.

In August 2020, citing ‘unreasonable bias’, a formal complaint was submitted by BPP students alleging the law school prioritised students with training contracts at the City Consortium law firms, while acting as the provider of training for the Solicitors Qualifying Examination (SQE), to which BPP had been appointed in December 2019. during the COVID-19 pandemic and sent them hard copies of study materials before the summer examination, an offer that was not extended to candidates without a training contract lined up. BPP denied the claims and allegations of favouritism.

On 15 December 2020, the student presidents of the four Inns of Court – Gray's Inn, Lincoln's Inn, Inner Temple and Middle Temple – wrote a joint letter to BPP University Law School about what they described as “systemic deficiencies” with the university's teaching. The student presidents of the four Inns, expressed their “unwavering solidarity” with students “negatively impacted” by the quality of teaching on BPP's Bar Professional Training Course and Graduate Diploma in Law programmes.
BPP launched a small talk initiative to its law students in chitchat and networking in 2021. Previously BPP started wellbeing initiative to teach students how to meditate and provided "specially commissioned audio meditations" to them.

In 2021, BPP launched pro bono clinic to help provide welfare rights advice.

In January 2022 a reverse mentoring scheme was launched by BPP where law students review law firms on diversity and inclusion.

BPP Professional Education Ltd awarded Ofsted ‘Good’ grade in 2022.

BPP University won Best Contribution by a Law School Award in 2022.

BPP was partnered with the O Shaped Lawyer for the SQE preparation courses.

In May 2021, official data from education watchdog Office for Students found the university to be the lowest ranked institution in the country for student employability. Reporting on the findings, The Daily Telegraph stated, "Over a year after graduating, 69.2% of students from BPP University - which specialises in law and accountancy courses - have not managed to secure graduate employment or further study."

2020 unfair faculty dismissal and Wikipedia
BPP University was accused of "disruptive editing" on Wikipedia in regards to a successful case for unfair dismissal brought against the school by its former lecturer Elizabeth Aylott.

From June to July 2020, it was reported that former employee Employment Law lecturer Elizabeth Aylott has successfully brought a constructive unfair dismissal claim at an employment tribunal after BPP University failed to reduce her workload despite her mental health struggles. Her concerns, later diagnosed as Autism Spectrum Disorder, were repeatedly raised issues in reference to her workload, including a period of working over 55 hours per week and having to cancel annual leave in order to meet work demands.

The tribunal found that Aylott had been constructively unfairly dismissed on the basis that BPP University's conduct had undermined trust and confidence. It was also held that an occupational health referral for Aylott was not arranged in a timely manner, and there had been a rush to secure her departure from the university as a result of stigma arising from her mental health.

Following the hearing at the London Central Employment Tribunal, the judgment of the Employment Tribunal was that BPP University (the Respondent) did: (a) Constructively unfairly dismiss Mrs Elizabeth Aylott (the Claimant) pursuant to sections 95 and section 98(4) Employment Rights Act 1996; and (b) Unfavourably treat the Claimant because of something arising from disability pursuant to section 15 of the Equality Act 2010 (“EqA”). However, the tribunal also dismissed claims of (a) Direct disability discrimination under section 13 of the Equality Act 2010; (c) Harassment relating to her disability under section 26 of EqA; (b) Indirect disability discrimination under section 19 of the EqA 2010; and (c) Failure to make reasonable adjustment under section 20 – 21 of EqA.

COVID-19 pandemic
On 20 March 2020, BPP University was criticised for having ‘not clearly communicated’ information to students after a student at its Waterloo campus had tested positive for Coronavirus.

Also during August 2020, BPP University's Leeds campus BPTC student Sophie Lamb told journalists that ‘she was forced to urinate in a bucket while sat in front of her laptop in her kitchen during the test’ while taking the online bar exams remotely, after students were told they could fail the exam ‘if they left their seats or did not maintain screen eye contact.’

On 2 October 2020, BPP Law School students expressed their frustration at exams being scheduled during the December 2020 winter vacation scheme season. Students said BPP University's timetabling decision would prevent them from participating in the winter vacation schemes run by law firms, which traditionally acts a gateway to a training contract for students. In response to the complaints regarding students being denied 2020 winter scheme work opportunities, a BPP spokesperson said, “Whilst it is unfortunate that BPP PGDL examinations do fall across the winter scheme dates, students do have the opportunity to attend a 2021 scheme.”

In July 2020, BPP was on the receiving end of criticism from its students during the COVID-19 pandemic for not delivering physical copies of “permitted materials” and textbooks to its Legal Practice Course students.

In an open letter to BPP's vice chancellor, students on the Legal Practice Course revealed that the law school's class sizes had more than quadrupled in the wake of COVID-19, with 15-person classes now containing up to 70 students. In the letter, BPP students claimed “BPP University’s response to lockdown and Coronavirus has only served to create an environment of mistrust and anxiety for students, severely degrade the quality of teaching and assessment, and push as many costs of adjusting to lockdown onto students.”

On 22 July 2020, The Lawyer reported that many BPP students were locked out of exams due to IT failures and had demanded a partial refund of their fees “based on the period of time students were unable to use BPP facilities.”

On 12 August 2020, the Junior Lawyers Division of the Law Society of England and Wales, which represents LPC students across England and Wales, questioned the university's decision to charge students registered at its London campuses higher fees than regional counterparts despite the switch to online education, and urged BPP to “take the time to talk with the group” and handle student concerns moving forward.

On 23 November 2020, BPP students said they intend to report the university to the Competition and Markets Authority after the institution refused for a second time to refund tuition fees for alleged lockdown failures.

Locations

The head office is at BPP House, Aldine Place, 142-144 Uxbridge Road, London, W12 8AA.

It has had study centres in Abingdon, Birmingham, Bristol, Cambridge, Leeds, Liverpool, London and Manchester. The business school is in the City of London and the law school in Holborn. In June 2018, BPP shut down its Liverpool campus and told all of its students in Liverpool to continue their studies at the Manchester campus instead.

As of October 2022 the locations listed by UCAS are in London Shepherd's Bush, BPP House at Uxbridge Road, Holborn and Waterloo. Outside of London there are Manchester, Leeds, Birmingham, Cambridge, Southampton and Bristol, as well as the Rotherham, Doncaster and South Humber NHS Trust.

Organisation and administration
On 30 July 2009, American private education company Apollo Group-run Apollo Global acquired BPP in a deal worth approximately $607 million, funded by an intercompany loan of approximately $104 million from Apollo Group to Apollo Global, $375 million in capital contributions from Apollo Group and $55 million in capital contributions from Apollo Global's minority shareholder, the Carlyle Group.

In June 2019, Times Higher Education reported that BPP owners, the Apollo Education Group, were looking to sell the university just two years after ownership changed hands in 2017, but in December 2019, The Lawyer reported that "BPP Law School has been taken off the market following six months in which no potential buyer willing to pay the asking price was found."

In March 2021, BPP was acquired by private equity house TDR Capital.

Academic profile

Courses listed by UCAS in 2022 are: 

 BSc Accounting and Finance, at Shepherds Bush
 MSc Accounting and Finance, at Birmingham, Manchester and Waterloo
 Advanced Diploma Accounting and Finance, at Birmingham, Manchester and Waterloo
 Barrister Training Course, at Bristol, Birmingham, Manchester, Leeds and Holborn

See also 
 Armorial of UK universities
 List of universities in the United Kingdom

References

External links
 

 

Distance education institutions based in the United Kingdom
For-profit universities and colleges in Europe
Private universities in the United Kingdom
Educational institutions established in 1992
1992 establishments in the United Kingdom
Universities in Greater Manchester
Apollo Education Group
Universities in London